Southern Pashto comprises the South Western and South Eastern dialects.

South Western 
Kandahārí Pashtó, also known as,  Southwestern Pashto, is a Pashto dialect, spoken in southern and western Afghanistan, including the city of Kandahar.

Kandahari Pashto is spoken in Kandahar, Helmand, Ghazni,  most of Urozgan, Farah, and Nimruz, southeastern Ghor, the districts of Murghab, Ghormach, Muqur, and Jawand in Badghis, and parts of Zabul, Paktika, and Herat provinces of Afghanistan. It is also spoken in parts of the provinces of Razavi Khorasan and South Khorasan in Iran, where they numbered roughly 120,000 (in 1993).

Lexical Variation 
According to the "Pashto Dialectal Dictionary" published by the Academy of Sciences of Afghanistan the following is noted in Kandahar province:

South Eastern

In all 3rd-person pronouns 'h' is  not articulated. And distinction in  'he' and 'she' pronouns is not noted.

Kākaṛi 
Kākaṛi is classed as Southeastern dialect. The following has been noted:

Sherani 
According to Josef Elfenbein, Sherani Pashto can be classed either as South Western or South Eastern. Word choice can be distinct:

Marwat-Bettani 
In Marwat-Bettani the following is noted:  

Compare the words

Comparison with  Karlāṇi  varieties 
Marwatwala agrees with other  Karlāṇi  varieties in the phonetic change in ښ as [ʃ]. 

Example:

Rendition of ش 

Example:

References

Languages of Pakistan
Languages of Afghanistan
Languages of Khyber Pakhtunkhwa
Pashto dialects
Varieties of Pashto